Saunders is an unincorporated community in Stanton County, Kansas, United States.

References

Further reading

External links
 Stanton County maps: Current, Historic, KDOT

Unincorporated communities in Stanton County, Kansas
Unincorporated communities in Kansas